Qadi Kola (also Romanized as Qādī Kolā and Qādī Kalā; also known as  Qāẕī Kalā) is a village in Garmab Rural District, Chahardangeh District, Sari County, Mazandaran Province, Iran. At the 2006 census, its population was 448, in 131 families.

References 

Populated places in Sari County